Sesamolin is a lignan isolated from sesame oil. Sesamin and sesamolin are minor components of sesame oil.

See also 
 Sesamol, another phenolic component of sesame oil

References 

Phenol antioxidants
Lignans
Benzodioxoles
Sesame